is a 1979 Japanese film directed by Eiichi Kudo.

Cast
Jinpachi Nezu as Toshio Aiba
Mieko Harada as Akiko Negishi
Ryudo Uzaki 
Shigeru Matsuzaki as Keiichi Mizunuma
Tsutomu Yamazaki as Shingo Takagi
Fumio Fujimura as Hideo Hanamura
Shingo Yamashiro as Hiroshi Kamamoto
Seizō Fukumoto as Gen Kanemitsu
Nobuo Kaneko as Hirokichi Asakura
Asao Koike as Hidenobu Hanamura
Kayo Matsuo as Ikenaga Satoko
Ryuji Katagiri as Ken Oba
Guts Ishimatsu as Genji Wada
Hōsei Komatsu as Tadashi Tatsuno
Kenichi Hagiwara (Cameo)
Hiroshi Miyauchi as Detective Ozawa
Mikio Narita as Takeshi Tsugawa
Hiroki Matsukata as Ikenaga Yasuharu

References

External links
 

1979 films
1970s adventure films
Films directed by Eiichi Kudo
1970s Japanese-language films
Yakuza films
1970s Japanese films